The Tamsui Customs Officers' Residence is a historical residence in Tamsui District, New Taipei, Taiwan.

History
After Taiwan was forced to open foreign trade in early 1860s, foreigners soon came into the island. Qing Dynasty government soon established a customs office in Tamsui in 1870 after the opening of Tamsui Port.

Architecture
The residence is a white-colored building built in a colonial style nicknamed Little White House. The building features banquet hall, master room etc.

Transportation
The residence is accessible within walking distance northwest of Tamsui Station of Taipei Metro.

See also
 List of tourist attractions in Taiwan

References

1870 establishments in Taiwan
Buildings and structures in New Taipei
Houses completed in 1870
Houses in Taiwan